Behsat Üvez, (May 2, 1959 - February 22, 2013) was a Turkish singer, composer, and teacher. He was the founder of Barana.

Üvez was born in Ankara.

Death 
On February 22, 2013, Behsat Üvez died of lung cancer in Groningen.

Discography

Albums 
 Barana Co. (2002)
 İleriye Anılar
 Gül ve Bülbül
 Şarap (2009)
 Xenopolis (2011, with Ceylan Ertem )
 Electro Shaman (2012)

Projects, Tours 
 Female Factory (1998, 1999, 2000)
 5-May project with the Metropol Orchestra (1998)
 Music Meeting (Nijmegen, 2000)
 Foundation Jazz Utrecht (2000-2001)
 The Culture Factory Amsterdam (1999-2000)
 Foundation Kulsan (2000)
 Circus Colourful City in Nijmegen (2001) 
 Global Village Orchestra (2001'den günümüze) 
 Festival "Klap op de Vuurpijl"-NPS/Radio 4 with Alan Laurrilard's Seafood plus (Aralık 2001) 
 Raiz met Fernando Lamerinihas (Şubat 2003)
 Made in Holland (Eylül, Ekim 2003)
 Xenopolis (2011)
 Barana Festival (2012)

References

External links 
 Barana Official Website
 Cazkolik Interview
 Radikal Newspaper Interview
 Carlama Interview

1959 births
2013 deaths
People from Ankara
Turkish male singers
State Artists of Turkey
Deaths from lung cancer in the Netherlands